Somos unos Animales is the second studio album by the Spanish hard rock band Extremoduro recorded in two weeks and released under the Pasión-Área Creativa label in July 1991. With the collaboration of vocalist and guitarist Rosendo Mercado (ex-Leño) on the songs " La canción de los oficios " (vocals) and " Perro Callejero " (guitar). Released in CD format on 27 October 1995 under DRO label.

Track listing
All songs written by Roberto Iniesta.

2011 edition bonus tracks

  *  Bonus tracks are on their 2004 version.

Personnel 
Extremoduro
 Robe Iniesta – vocals, guitar
 Salo – guitar, bass
 Carlos "el Sucio" – bass
 Luis "von Fanta" – drums
Additional personnel
 Rosendo Mercado (ex-Leño) – Vocals on "La canción de los oficios" and guitar on "Perro Callejero"
 J. L. Macías – Piano on "La canción de los oficios" and kazoo on "Ni príncipes ni princesas"
 Goyo Esteban – Organ on "Ni príncipes ni princesas"
 María y Belén – Backing vocals on "Tu corazón", "Quemando tus recuerdos" and "Desidia"
 Engineering: Kike Díez
 Assistant engineering: Goyo Esteban and Kiji
 Design: T. Rodríguez and Carmelo Oñate

Charts and certifications

Certifications

References

External links 
 Extremoduro official website (in Spanish)

1991 albums
Extremoduro albums
Spanish-language albums